Oecanthus laricis, the laricis tree cricket or tamarack tree cricket, is a species of cricket endemic to the Great Lakes region in the Midwestern United States and Ontario, Canada.

It produces one generation annually.

References

laricis
Odonata of North America
Taxonomy articles created by Polbot
Insects described in 1963